The 1946 Balkan Cup was the 8th edition of this tournament. The participanting teams were Kingdom of Yugoslavia, Bulgaria, Romania and for the first time ever, Albania, who ended up winning the tournament in their first try.

Squads
The four men's national teams involved in the tournament were required to register a squad of over 14 players, including one or two goalkeepers.
The age listed for each player is on 7 October 1946, the first day of the tournament.
The club listed is the club for which the player last played a competitive match prior to the tournament.

Albania

Coach:  Ljubiša Broćić

Bulgaria

Coach:  Todor Konov

Romania

Coach:  Virgil Economu

Yugoslavia

Coach:  Milorad Arsenijević and  Aleksandar Tirnanić

Table

Results

Winner

Statistics

Goalscorers

References

External links 
 Balkan and Central European Championship 1946 at EU-Football.info

1946
1946–47 in European football
1946–47 in Romanian football
1946–47 in Bulgarian football
1946–47 in Yugoslav football
1946 in Albanian football